"John the Fisherman" is the debut single by American rock band Primus. It was first released on December 30, 1989 on the live album Suck on This, then re-released a year later on May 17, 1990, this time on their debut studio album Frizzle Fry as the lead single.

The band's frontman Les Claypool said of the song:  "John the Fisherman" was written so long ago. I like to write about things I know about so that I don’t sound like a dipshit talking over my head. I fish. Some dads take their kids to football games or baseball games. My dad took me fishing. That’s what we did, almost every weekend. My uncle, my grandfather, that’s what we did. It’s a big part of my history. So, for me, it was always easy to write about. These fishing songs kept popping up, themes about the ocean, and it made it like a chronicle, a subdivision of our body of work.

The live version of "John the Fisherman" that appears on Suck on This contains an intro consisting of the intro to the 1981 Rush instrumental "YYZ".

Release
Although the band did release the song as a single and filmed a video for it (featuring the band members performing the song on a boat, with a cameo appearance by Kirk Hammett of Metallica, who has been a close friend of Claypool since they attended the same school), the single had very limited success due to its being released on an indie label, and the band did not receive mainstream attention until their next single, "Jerry Was a Race Car Driver", from their 1991 major label debut Sailing the Seas of Cheese. Because of this, many overlook "John the Fisherman" and claim "Jerry Was a Race Car Driver" was Primus' first single. When Frizzle Fry was re-released in 2002, many fans who caught on during the major label days of the band bought the album, and it became a fan favorite. There was a new interest in this song, and it received some radio and MTV airplay.

Fisherman's Chronicles
"John the Fisherman" is the first part of a four-part story called the "Fisherman's Chronicles", which continued on Primus' later albums. Its immediate sequel was "Fish On (Fisherman Chronicles, Chapter II)" on 1991's Sailing the Seas of Cheese, followed by "The Ol' Diamondback Sturgeon (Fisherman's Chronicles, Pt. 3)" on 1993's Pork Soda and most recently "Last Salmon Man" on 2011's Green Naugahyde.

Reception
AllMusic writer Ned Raggett thought that the song "probably remains the most concentrated blast" on the album.

Appearances
Master recording in Guitar Hero II
South Park episode "Guitar Queer-O"
Downloadable track for Guitar Hero III Mobile

References

Songs about fictional male characters
Songs about fishers
Fictional fishers
1989 songs
1989 debut singles
1990 singles
Primus (band) songs
Songs written by Les Claypool
Caroline Records singles